In geometry, the director circle of an ellipse or hyperbola (also called the orthoptic circle or Fermat–Apollonius circle) is a circle consisting of all points where two perpendicular tangent lines to the ellipse or hyperbola cross each other.

Properties
The director circle of an ellipse circumscribes the minimum bounding box of the ellipse. Additionally, it has the property that, when viewed from any point on the circle, the ellipse spans a right angle.

The director circle of a hyperbola has radius , and so, may not exist in the Euclidean plane, but could be a circle with imaginary radius in the complex plane.

Generalization
More generally, for any collection of points , weights , and constant , one can define a circle as the locus of points  such that

Related constructions
In the case of a parabola the director circle degenerates to a straight line, the directrix of the parabola.

Notes

References
.
.

.
.
.

Conic sections
Circles